Arad is a city in the Southern District of Israel.

After attempts to settle the area in the 1920s, Arad was founded in November 1962 as an Israeli development town, the first planned city in Israel. Arad's population grew significantly with the Aliyah from the former Soviet Union.

Landmarks in Arad include the ruins of Tel Arad, Arad Park, a domestic airfield and Israel's first legal race circuit. The city is known for its annual summer music festival, the Arad Festival.

History

Antiquity

The Bible (Judges 1:16) describes it as a Canaanite stronghold whose king kept the Israelites from moving from the Negev to the Judean Mountains, although Tel Arad was destroyed over 1,200 years before the arrival of the Israelites. However, Shoshenq I's chronicles seem to mention a settlement in Tel Arad. After its destruction during the Canaanite era, the town lay abandoned for centuries before being resettled by the Israelites from the 11th century BC onward. The Israelites initially settled it as an unwalled piece of land cut off as an official or sacred domain was established on the upper hill. It was later a garrison-town known as "The Citadel". The citadel and sanctuary are believed to have been constructed at the time of Kings David and Solomon. Artifacts found within the sanctuary of the citadel mostly reflect offerings of oil, wine, wheat, etc. brought there by numerous people during the time of the Kingdom of Judah, up to Judah's fall to the Babylonians. Under the Judaean kings, the citadel was periodically refortified, remodeled and rebuilt, until ultimately it was destroyed between 597 BCE and 577 BCE whilst Jerusalem was under siege by Babylonian king Nebuchadnezzar II. However, during the Persian, Maccabean, Roman, and early Muslim eras, locals continued to transport these items to the sacred precinct of the upper hill. Markers of these ancient Israelite rituals remain to this day, with broken pottery littering the entire site.

During the Byzantine period, the location was still correctly identified by Eusebius, and the name "Arad" was preserved by the Bedouins. Ancient Arad became a Christian bishopric. Stephanus, one of its bishops, was a signatory of the synodal letter of John III of Jerusalem against Severus of Antioch in 518 and took part in the 536 synod of the three Roman provinces of Palaestina Prima, Palaestina Secunda, and Palaestina Salutaris (to the last of which Arad belonged) against Anthimus I of Constantinople. No longer a residential bishopric, Arad is today listed by the Catholic Church as a titular see.

British Mandate era
The first modern attempt to settle the area was made by the Yishuv, the body of Jewish residents in Mandatory Palestine, on 23 February 1921, when the British Mandate government allowed discharged soldiers from the Jewish Legion to settle in the area. Nine men and two women attempted the task, but after four months were forced to leave because water was not found in the area.

State of Israel

On 15 November 1960, a planning team, followed by a full-fledged committee on 29 December, was appointed by the Israeli cabinet to examine the possibility of establishing a city in the northeastern Negev desert and Arad region. An initial budget of IL50,000 was granted for the project, headed by Aryeh Eliav. On 31 January 1961, the final location was chosen ( southwest of Mount Kidod), and plans were approved for roads and water connections. In March 1961, blueprints for a city of 10,000- 20,000 residents were drawn up. Yona Pitelson was the chief architect and planner.

The plan took into account topography and climate, with residential buildings constructed with large inner courtyards that offered protection from the desert sun and wind. High density residential areas were built first in order to create an urban milieu and shorten walking distances.

The oil company Nefta built a work camp in the area in July 1961, consisting of six temporary sheds, after oil was found there in commercial quantities. The town itself was established in 1962 by a group of young ex-kibbutz and ex-moshav members seeking an environment free of overcrowding, traffic, noise, and pollution. The founding ceremony was held on 21 November, and attended by then-Prime Minister David Ben-Gurion. It was one of the last development towns to be founded. According to the city website, Arad was the first pre-planned city in Israel.

Until 1964 Arad had about 160 families, most of whom were natives. After 1971 Arad began absorbing olim (Jewish immigrants), mostly from the Soviet Union, but also from English speaking countries and Latin America, and its population increased from 4,000 in 1969 to 10,500 in 1974 and 12,400 in 1983. During the first half of the 1990s, Arad absorbed 6,000 immigrants from the former Soviet Union. In 1995, the city had 20,900 residents. Prime Minister Yitzhak Rabin declared Arad a city on 29 June 1995.

Geography

Arad is located mostly on the western and southwestern Kidod Range, and the Arad Plain, which marks the southwestern end of the Judean Desert.

The historical site of Tel Arad and the Arad Park (also known as Ran Grove) can also be found within its municipal area, west of the urban core. Arad also has a commercial landing strip located slightly to the south of its urban core. It borders the Tamar and Abu Basma regional councils, and the closest local municipality to Arad is the Bedouin local council Kuseife.

Neighborhoods

Each neighborhood in Arad contains streets named in a thematic manner, for example, a neighborhood where all streets are named after jewels. The exception to this are the four central quarters, which have more conventional street names, and the original two neighborhoods (Rishonim and Ne'urim). The themed neighborhoods make up the entire city north of Highway 31. South of the highway is Arad's industrial zone (the northern area being the light industry zone). The neighborhoods are as follows:

Geology and topography

The western part of Arad is made up of Loess land, while the eastern part is made up of sedimentary rock, including chalk, flint and dolomite.

Other peaks within the municipal borders include Mount Kina and Mount Brir. There are several wadis that pass through Arad, notably the Ye'elim Stream (which runs along Highway 31) and Tze'elim Stream. Others include the Hesed, Keisan, Kidod, Kina, Malhata, Pra'im, Tavya, and other streams.

Climate

Arad is thus situated in an arid area, where most precipitation falls in the winter months of December, January and February. It does however, on rare occasions, snow. Two examples are the massive snowstorm during the 1991–92 winter that swept through entire mountainous region of the Negev and January's snowstorm of 2008.

Demographics

According to the Israel Central Bureau of Statistics, of Arad's 24,400 2015 population, 80.3% were Jews, and another 16.8% were other non-Arabs. 11,900 (~48.8%) were men and 12,500 were women. 33.8% (the second highest in the country) were immigrants since 1990. Arad's population peaked in 2002 at 24,500. Arad's former mayor, Moty Brill, said that the reason for the city's decline is its failure to absorb the massive immigration from Russia. In early 2007, a study ordered by the Israeli Housing and Construction Ministry found that Arad suffered from a negative image, and described it a "settlement that drives residents away".

In 2015, Arad had 10,983 (~45%) salaried workers and 529 (~2.2%) self-employed. 11,805 were receiving children's benefits, 321 were receiving unemployment benefits, and 1,168 were receiving income guarantee. The average monthly income for self-employed workers was NIS 6,934, with salaried employees earning an average of NIS 6,988 (NIS 9,008 for men and NIS 5,184 for women).

The IDF's City of Training Bases, under construction near Beersheba, hopes to bring thousands of soldiers (mostly officers, senior NCOs and other staff) to live in the Negev, including Arad. According to Orli Yehezkel, CEO of the Ministry for the Development of the Negev and Galilee, said NIS 4.5 million will be invested in Arad, including a subsidy of NIS 1,000 per family per month for two years for families of soldiers wishing to move to Arad.

The Negev and Galilee Development Ministry envisions a tripling of Arad's population by 2025.

Economy

Other than tourist venues, Arad's commerce is mostly concentrated in the central commerce area, as envisioned in the original plan. There is one shopping mall in the city, the Arad Mall, in the northern block of the commerce sector. In addition to the main area, there are small shop clusters in most neighborhoods in the city, notably a building called The Star (HaKokhav) in the Tlalim quarter. A lone supermarket outside the center, Mega in the City, is located in the industrial zone, near the entrance to the city, and a major shopping complex is planned near it by a real estate company called Zim Centers. The Arad Market, open on Mondays, is located in the light industry zone.

Among the companies with manufacturing plants in Arad are Arad Textile Industries, one of Israel's largest producers of towels, Flextronics Israel, A.M.S. Electronics who manufacture printed circuit boards and electronic products, El-Ran Timber Industries, Jordael who manufacture cosmetic products, and a Unilever Shefa Israel cereal plant. Since 1971, Arad has been producing phosphoric acid, made from brine collected from the Dead Sea, and phosphates from the nearby Tzefa. Rotem Amfert Negev Ltd, a subsidiary of Israel Chemicals Ltd (ICL), has been planning a new phosphate plant in the Sdeh Brir area for several years. In 2008, the Ministry of the Environment decided not to contest the company's bid, despite studies showing it may increase air pollution-related deaths in the area.

Tourism

In addition to the annual music festival, Arad's fresh air attracts asthmatics from all over the world, and its proximity to the Dead Sea provides a less expensive accommodation alternative to the pricey hotel zone on the sea shore. The Arad municipality has begun to develop hiking and ecological tourism. Additionally, many visitors to Masada stay in Arad, which is the closest ( by road) urban settlement to the site and provides the only access to its western side. On the outskirts of Arad, near the hotel area, there is a large white monument conceived by Yigal Tumarkin in 1968, called Mitzpe Mo'av (Mo'av Lookout), which also offers a view of the Judean Desert.

The Israel National Trail passes through Arad, between Mount Kina and Tel Arad, a major archeological site and national park. Although not located within Arad's jurisdiction, the Zohar Peak and Zohar Lookout (Mitzpe Zohar) are common hiking and biking destinations on the national trail. The trails codenamed 11335 and 11240 run along the national trail in this area.

Culture 
Arad's main cultural center is the Center for Culture, Youth and Sports (Matnas), named after Samuel Rubin and located on Ben Yair Street near the Arad Mall. It was built in 1983 and contains the Arad Museum, Arad's public library, a concert hall and the Arad Visitor Center, founded in 1989.

The Oron movie theater designed by the architect Menachem Cohen closed during the tenure of Mayor Moty Brill. Eshet Lot, an artists quarter, is located in the city's industrial zone, utilizing old warehouses. The city also has a conservatory and concert hall.

In 2007, the Ministry for the Development of the Negev and Galilee proposed moving the national archive of Israel from Jerusalem to Arad and opening a museum.

Arad was known for its annual music festival, first held in 1982. It was a popular event and a major magnet for artists until 1995. On 18 July 1995, three teenagers were crushed to death by a falling gate during a farewell concert by the band Mashina. Despite the festival organizers' attempts to keep the festival going it was cut short. Five of the festival's organizers received prison sentences of up to one year.

Other notable parks include:
Gan HaPsalim (a.k.a. Park HaNsharim), the park at the entrance to the city, with monuments of various desert animals
Gan HaHamisha (Garden of the Five), a memorial park for the five residents of Arad who were killed in action in the Six-Day War. Includes a monument for the soldiers, as well as a stone structure called Amud HaBulbusim (lit. Pillar of the Potatoes, because of its shape), which marks Arad's place in the desert and their residents' control of the territory according to Bedouin tradition – designed by Yona Pitelson.
Northern Park, to the north of the Halamish neighborhood
Gan Harpatka'ot (Adventure Park), a large playground and open grass area in the Rishonim neighborhood

The main cluster of recreational facilities is located in the Ayanot neighborhood also called Kiryat HaSport. Facilities include a swimming pool, tennis courts, a country club and playgrounds. The city's main football stadium is located nearby on the corner of Yehuda and Palmach Streets. The stadium is home to Hapoel Arad, which plays in Liga Bet, the fourth tier of Israeli football.

Since 2000, Arad also hosts an annual mountain biking tournament, Riding Arad, in memory of Itamar Ilya, a soldier killed in action in Lebanon in 1997. In March 2008, the tournament became part of an international Union Cycliste Internationale competition, which is co-hosted by Misgav and Ma'alot.

Healthcare
Arad does not have a hospital, but there are numerous medical clinics, including Clalit, Leumit and Maccabi. Emergencies are handled by the single Magen David Adom station, located in the municipal compound.

A medical center was also built in the compound in 2004, named Schaller Medical Centre after Leon and Freda Schaller from London, who were the prime donors. It serves as an emergency ward, but does not have the equipment needed to perform operations, and such patients are transferred to the Soroka Medical Center. On average, 10% of the patients are transferred.

Law enforcement
Arad is served by a local Israel Police station, located next to the municipal compound and the Magen David Adom station. It is commanded by Superintendent Yuval Paz and has 58 members. Arad's station also serves the Sodom area.

Arad's police force was chosen as the exceptional force for 2007, and awarded an award of excellence on 5 March 2008. Among others, a severe reduction in property crime was cited. Arad's force was able to reduce the amount of such crimes from 1,092 in 2003 to just 168 in 2007. On 18 July 2008, Arad police, in a rare incident, shot dead a man threatening to kill his ex-wife with a knife.

Education and religious institutions

Arad has a public elementary school in every central neighborhood (Halamish, Tlalim, Avishur, Leva'ot and Ye'elim (called Ye'elim-Ofarim)), while Tlalim is a religious school. There is one public middle school, Re'ut, located near the junction of the Yoshiyahu and HaKana'im streets. The second middle school, Allon, was closed in 2007 and merged into ORT Arad, the city's only public secondary school, which shares a building with the Re'ut middle school and the former Yigal Allon school. In the 2006–07 school year, 57.14% of Arad's 12th graders were eligible for a Bagrut (matriculation) certificate, compared to a national average of 45.9%. In the 2007–08-year, the number dropped to 49.67%, compared to a national average of 46.3%.

In addition, there are several private and Haredi schools in Arad, such as the Shuvu movement's grades 1–8 school, and the Gerrer Haredi school. Other Haredi schools include the boys' Beit Ya'akov and girls' Kol Ya'akov in the Halamish neighborhood, the Lev Simcha Yeshiva, and the Beit Ya'akov High School. Religious Zionist schools include the Ne'ot Avraham Bnei Akiva Ulpana, which also provides young women with the guidance to perform volunteer activities in the community, and the Tlalim Elementary School, founded in 1971.

SOS Children's Village Arad (known as Kfar Neradim) was built in the southern outskirts of Arad and inaugurated on 27 October 1981. It consists of twelve family houses, to accommodate up to 120 children. There is also an SOS Youth Facility to accommodate 12 to 14 youths from the SOS Children's Village. In January 2005, an SOS Social Centre was opened at Arad. It runs a day-care center and various community outreach programmes to support socially weak families. Until fall 2008, the World Union of Jewish Students (WUJS), funded by Jews from New Jersey, had an institute in Arad which allowed post-college young Jews from around the world to study Israeli society and the Hebrew language. When WUJS's ownership changed, the institute was moved to the center of the country.

Arad has 22 synagogues, of which 11 are Ashkenazi, 9 are Sephardi, one is Yemenite, and one is Ethiopian. Both the central Ashkenazi and Sephardi synagogues are located in the Ye'elim neighborhood. A Masorti synagogue, Shira Hadasha is in the Rishonim neighborhood. There are Gerrer synagogues in Avishur and Halamish, and a Chabad synagogue in Ye'elim. There are two mikvehs in the city–in the Tlalim and Ayanot neighborhoods. The city also has a small Messianic community that is being accused of illegal missionary activities by the Haredim and certain right-wing groups. Arad's dead are mostly buried in the local cemetery, located in the northeastern outskirts of the city, close to the road to Masada.

Media
Arad's local newspaper, Kidod, was published by the entrepreneurs Eli and Rochale Ziv, early founders of Arad. Kidod started as a small leaflet in December 1966 and grew to a become a full paper. At its peak, it was circulated, free of charge, in groceries, kiosks, etc., in 3,000 copies each week. Kidod ran for 23 years and had a key role in the cultural and community life of Arad. HaTzvi Arad is the local newspaper today.

Transportation

Arad is reached by Highway 31, which connects it with Beersheba to the west, and the Dead Sea to the east. It has two junctions within Arad's municipal area—the Arad Junction (within the city itself, with Road 3199), and the Tel Arad Junction (with Highway 80). The local Road 3199 connects Arad with Masada, but does not connect to the road next to the dead sea (Highway 90). It is therefore the only way to get to Masada's western side.

Arad's airfield, first used during the music festival of 1994, is located south of the city, and serves domestic flights according to demand. In May 2017, a new railway line to Arad via Kuseife was approved.  The line will connect to the existing Beersheba-Dimona rail line at Nevatim. Its terminus will be adjacent to the central bus station.

Arad Central Bus Station, once located on the corner of Yerushalayim Street and Yehuda Street was closed due to a legal battle between the municipality and the Egged Bus Cooperative. A new station was subsequently built with seven platforms and a park and ride lot.

Buses in Arad are served by the Egged Bus Cooperative and Metropoline. A multitude of inter-city bus routes are served by the main station, two more inter-city Haredi routes which leave from the north, as well as five inner routes (1, 2, 3, 11, 12). The inter-city routes are :

Local government

Arad has, since its inception in 1962, been under the governance of a regional council and local council, before being designated as a city council in 1995. Democratic elections have been held in Arad since 1966, although only Avraham Shochat, Betzalel Tabib and Moty Brill were ever elected or re-elected as the head of the municipality. The first mayor of the city of Arad was Betzalel Tabib who served as both head of the local council and city council. He was replaced by Mordechai Brill in 2003, although due to his inability to pass a yearly budget, Brill was dismissed by the Minister of the Interior Meir Sheetrit in August 2007, and a government-appointed clerk, Gideon Bar-Lev, took his place. An election took place again 13 April 2010, won by Tali Ploskov of the Yisrael Beiteinu party. The longest serving head of Arad's municipality was Avraham Shochat who served as head of the local council between 1967 and 1986.

Arad's yearly budget is over 100 million NIS and over $30 million USD. On 27 December 2007, the 2008 budget was unanimously passed at NIS 123 million by the city council. The city's total income for the year is estimated at approximately NIS 119 million.

While it is not customary for Israeli cities to have major unique/auxiliary laws, many cities have minor laws. In Arad, it is illegal to feed animals in public places. It is also illegal to sell or consume sunflower seeds, peanuts, etc. in public places, due to an anti-littering law enacted in 1965. There are in all 27 auxiliary laws in Arad, which were enacted between 1965 and 2000.

Municipal flag and emblem

The emblem of Arad is a square with a hill and a flame. The hill represents Mount Kidod, a hill in the northeastern part of the city, and the flame represents natural gas, which was extracted in the area in Arad's early days and spurred the city's growth. The emblem was adopted on 19 May 1966. The flag of Arad is a rectangle with a 2:3 ratio, which has a light blue background and shows the emblem in the center with the Hebrew text for "Municipality of Arad" at the top and the English text "City of ARAD Israel" (or variations thereof) and the bottom. This is the de facto flag, and there is no law or edict making it official.

Notable people

Amos Oz (1939–2018), writer

Twin towns – sister cities
 Wilmington, Delaware became a sister city of Arad in 1973, to commemorate the 25th anniversary of the State of Israel.
 Dinslaken, Germany signed a twinning agreement with Arad in 1989.
 Burlington, Vermont developed a sister city relationship with Arad in 1991. Then Mayor Bezalel Tabib, along with Professor Walid Dajani, who represented Bethlehem, visited Burlington to sign a three cities cooperative agreement—the first-ever sister-city pacts among American, Palestinian, and Israeli communities.

References

External links

 
Aradnik, the internet version of Arad's local HaTzvi weekly 
Arad by Google Maps

Populated places established in 1956
Cities in Israel
Development towns
Cities in Southern District (Israel)
Judaean Desert